Bárbara Catalina Riveros Díaz (born 3 August 1987, in Santiago de Chile) is a Chilean professional triathlete, 2008, 2012, 2016, and 2020 Olympian. She was the ITU (now World Triathlon) World Sprint Distance Champion in 2012.

In France, Bárbara Riveros takes part in the prestigious Club Championship Series Lyonnaise des Eaux.
In 2011, Riveros represents Tri Val de Grey and won the opening triathlon in Nice (24 April 2011), and she placed third at the second Grand Prix triathlon in Dunkirk (22 May 2011) behind Andrea Hewitt and Emma Moffatt.

In Chile, Bárbara Riveros represents the Club Deportivo Universidad Católica and studies Nutrition at the Universidad de Chile.

Her coach was Jamie Turner up to 2010 when he was employed by the Australian NSWIS. Her present coach is Darren Smith. Bárbara Riveros' father, Agustín Riveros, is a physician and brought Bárbara into contact with sports in early childhood.

ITU Competitions 
In the nine years from 2002 to 2010, Bárbara Riveros took part in 47 ITU events and achieved 27 top ten positions. Riveros started the season 2011 with four medals, among which the silver medal at the World Championship Series triathlon in Sydney and the gold medal at the World Cup triathlon in Ishigaki.

The following list is based upon the official ITU rankings and the ITU Athletes's Profile Page. Unless indicated otherwise, the following events are triathlons (Olympic Distance) and refer to the Elite category.

BG = the sponsor British Gas · DNF = did not finish · DNS = did not start

Notes

External links 
 Barbara Riveros Diaz' website
 Chilean Triathlon Federation in Spanish

Chilean female triathletes
1987 births
Living people
Sportspeople from Santiago
Triathletes at the 2011 Pan American Games
Triathletes at the 2015 Pan American Games
Triathletes at the 2019 Pan American Games
Triathletes at the 2008 Summer Olympics
Triathletes at the 2012 Summer Olympics
Triathletes at the 2016 Summer Olympics
Triathletes at the 2020 Summer Olympics
Olympic triathletes of Chile
Pan American Games medalists in triathlon
Pan American Games gold medalists for Chile
South American Games gold medalists for Chile
South American Games silver medalists for Chile
South American Games medalists in triathlon
Competitors at the 2014 South American Games
Competitors at the 2018 South American Games
Medalists at the 2015 Pan American Games
Medalists at the 2011 Pan American Games